Lily Esther Butters,  (March 25, 1894 – June 3, 1980) was a Canadian who founded the Cecil Butters Memorial Hospital, or the Butters Centre, which cared for mentally disabled children. It was named in honour of her son, Cecil. It operated from 1947 to 1990.

In 1972, she was made an Officer of the Order of Canada.

References
 

1894 births
1980 deaths
Officers of the Order of Canada